The Channel Tunnel Rail Link (Supplementary Provisions) Act 2008 (c. 5) is an Act of the Parliament of the United Kingdom which amends the Channel Tunnel Rail Link Act 1996.  Its principal provision is to allow the Office of Rail Regulation to charge the operator of the Channel Tunnel Rail Link "a fee in respect of the exercise of any of the Office of Rail Regulation's functions in relation to the rail link".

Passage of the bill
The legislation was introduced to the House of Commons as the Channel Tunnel Rail Link (Supplementary Provisions) Bill by the Secretary of State for Transport, Ruth Kelly, on 8 November 2007. The Bill was read for the third time in the House of Commons on 17 January 2008 and passed to the House of Lords with one amendment agreed. The Bill was read for the third time in the House of Lords on 13 May 2008 and was passed without further amendment.

Section 6 - Interpretation, commencement, short title
Section 6(2) provides that the Act came into force at the end of the period of two months that began on the date on which it was passed. The word "months" means calendar months. The day (that is to say, 22 May 2008) on which the Act was passed (that is to say, received royal assent) is included in the period of two months. This means that the Act came into force on 22 July 2008.

References

External links
The Channel Tunnel Rail Link (Supplementary Provisions) Act 2008, as amended from the National Archives.
The Channel Tunnel Rail Link (Supplementary Provisions) Act 2008, as originally enacted from the National Archives.
Explanatory notes to the Channel Tunnel Rail Link (Supplementary Provisions) Act 2008.
theyworkforyou.com - Hansard records of Parliamentary debate relating to the Act

United Kingdom Acts of Parliament 2008
Act 2008
2008 in rail transport